Piotr Matuszewski (born 22 April 1998) is a Polish tennis player.

Matuszewski has a career high ATP singles ranking of 763 achieved on 2 October 2017. He also has a career high doubles ranking of 183 achieved on 8 August 2022.

Matuszewski has won 1 ATP Challenger doubles title at the 2022 Uruguay Open with Karol Drzewiecki.

Tour titles

Doubles

References

External links
 
 

1998 births
Living people
Polish male tennis players
People from Ostrów Wielkopolski